Sharon Glynn is a camogie player and manager, an All Ireland medalist in 1996 and the star of her county’s 2002 victory in the National Camogie League when she scored three goals in Galway’s 6-6 to 1-7 victory over Limerick. She was nominated for an All Star award in 2005.

Career
Her inter-county career that began in 1990 when she was only 15. She was a member of the 1994 National League winning team and the 1998 Galway team beaten by Cork in the All Ireland final. 

She starred in the 1996 All Ireland final, Galway’s first victory in the All Ireland Championship, despite taking a blow to the head that affected her accuracy for long periods. Another outstanding performance was in the 2001 All Ireland semi-final against Kilkenny.
She retired from inter-county camogie in 2003.

With her club Pearses she scored crucial goals in the finals of each of their five All Ireland senior club championship victories of 1996-7 and 2000-2, scoring 1-2 in the 1996 and 1-4 in the 1997 victories, scoring 1-5 in the 2000 victory over Swatragh, scoring two goals and two points in the 2001 final against Cashel and scoring 1-9 in the 2002 final against St Ibar’s.

In a club match in 2001 she was filling in for county goalkeeper Louise Curry when she scored a goal from her own puck-out.

Management
She managed Galway for two years 2005-6, at the time becoming the only female manager at inter-county level in camogie. She assembled a strong backroom team by adding two-time All-Ireland winner Damian Naughton and former Galway under-21 and Minor All-Ireland winner Damian Coleman as selectors alongside former senior hurler PJ Molloy.

She was a nominee for camogie manager of the year after guiding the county to National Camogie League honours in 2005. and beating Cork by a goal in the final.

See also
 Glynn (disambiguation)

References

External links
 Camogie.ie Official Camogie Association Website
 Wikipedia List of Camogie players

Living people
Galway camogie players
Year of birth missing (living people)